This is a list of reptiles of Hungary. There is a total of 19 native and introduced species.

Lacertilia (lizards) 

 Anguis colchica – eastern slowworm

 Anguis fragilis – common slowworm 
 Ablepharus kitaibelii – European copper skink, European snake-eyed skink 
 Lacerta agilis – sand lizard 
 Lacerta viridis – European green lizard 
 Mediodactylus kotschyi – Kotschy's gecko (probably introduced)
 Podarcis muralis – common wall lizard 
 Podarcis tauricus – Balkan wall lizard 
 Zootoca vivipara – viviparous lizard, common lizard

Serpentes (snakes) 

 Coronella austriaca – smooth snake 

 Dolichophis caspius – Caspian whipsnake
 Natrix natrix – grass snake 
 Natrix tessellata – dice snake 
 Vipera berus – common European adder, common European viper 
 Vipera nikolskii – Nikolsky's adder, forest-steppe adder
 Vipera ursinii rakosiensis – Hungarian meadow viper 
 Zamenis longissimus – Aesculapian snake

Emydidae (pond turtles) 

 Emys orbicularis – European pond turtle 
 Trachemys scripta – pond slider (introduced)

References 

Reptiles
Hungary
Hungary
Reptiles